Ashabi-Kahf is a sanctuary in a natural cave which is located in the eastern part of the city of Nakhchivan, in the Nakhchivan Autonomous Republic of Azerbaijan. Since ancient times Ashabi-Kahf is considered as a sacred place. It is known not only in the Republic, but also in other regions of Azerbaijan and countries of the Middle East. Each year tens of thousands of people make a pilgrimage to this place.

In the Qur’an 
The meaning of Ashabi-Kahf in Arabic is “the cave possessers”. Ashabi-Kahf was mentioned in chapter 18 of Islam's holy book, the  Qur'an. The surah is a parable about a group of young believers who had stood against those who trusted in others, besides God and hid themselves inside a cave in order to escape a persecution. The Qur'an says that number of young believers and the length of their stay is known only to God. It also emphasized that it is not the important part of the story, but rather the lessons learned from it. The event described in holy Qur'an can also be seen in legends about Ashabi-Kahf in.

Structure  
The natural structure of the cave, as well as geographical conditions allows say it is one of the early settlements in Azerbaijan. Natural shelters reminds rooms. There was a spring at the entrance of the cave. But later this spring was dried up. The restoration and construction works in "Ashabi-Kahf" was carried in 1998 in accordance with the instructions of Heydar Aliyev,  National Leader of the Republic of Azerbaijan. A mosque was built, road was laid and everything was performed for the good and proper conditions of pilgrims.

References

External links 
 Nakhchivan-Ashabi-Kahf

Caves of Azerbaijan
Nakhchivan (city)